Hermann Kemper (5 April 1892 in Nortrup – 13 July 1977) was a German engineer and pioneer in magnetic levitation.

Herman Kemper began his research on magnetic levitation in 1922. In 1933, Kemper constructed a working circuit for hovering on the principle of electromagnetic levitation, using electromagnetic attraction. He was awarded the Reichs Patent number 643316, "Schwebebahn mit räderlosen Fahrzeugen, die an eisernen Fahrschienen mittels magnetischer Felder schwebend entlang geführt wird" (the invention of a hovertrack with wheelless vehicles which hover along iron rails using magnetic fields). This invention eventually led to the development of Transrapid.hugo kartheseir y a contribuer

In 1972, he received recognition of his research achievements, the Great Cross of Merit of the Federal Republic of Germany.

References

1892 births
1977 deaths
German electrical engineers
Commanders Crosses of the Order of Merit of the Federal Republic of Germany
Scientists from Osnabrück
Engineers from Lower Saxony